The 1959 World Sportscar Championship was the seventh FIA World Sportscar Championship.  It was a series for sportscars that ran in many worldwide endurance events.  It ran from 21 March 1959 to 5 September 1959, and comprised five races, following the 1000 km Buenos Aires being removed from the calendar, although the race did return in 1960.

The championship was won by Aston Martin.

Season

The championship comprised five qualifying rounds; the 12 Hours of Sebring, the Targa Florio run over 1000 km, the Nürburgring 1000 km, the 24 Hours of Le Mans, and the RAC Tourist Trophy run over 6 hours.

At the Sebring 12 Hours in Florida, the Scuderia Ferrari scored a 1-2 with Porsche filling the next three places. Aston Martin sent a single DBR1, as a favour to the organisers, in the hands of Salvadori and Shelby but it retired early in the race. Porsche dominated the Targa Florio  winning with the little Porsche 718 RSK whilst 2-3-4 places were filled by other Porsche models. Meanwhile, the works Ferraris all retired. Aston Martin missed the event as back in England, David Brown of Aston Martin had initially ruled against a World Championship challenge, on financial grounds. But, Stirling Moss wangled one DBR1/300 works car to win the Nürburgring 1000 km, with Jack Fairman beating the Hill/Gendebien Ferrari by over 40 seconds with the best placed Porsche in fourth. At Le Mans, the Astons of Roy Salvadori/Carroll Shelby and Maurice Trintignant/Paul Frère finished one-two!. The works Ferrari Testa Rossas all retired as did the works Porsches leaving privately entered Ferrari 250GTs to complete the minor placings. So David Brown’s company simply had to field a full three-car team in what had become the title-deciding race, the RAC Tourist Trophy. Despite setting fire to their race leading car during a schedule refuelling stop, the sister car of Shelby/Fairman/Moss took victory and saw Aston Martin become the first British manufacturer ever to win the FIA World Sportscar Championship.

Season results

Results

Championship
Note: 

Championship points were awarded for the first six places in each race in the order of 8-6-4-3-2-1.
Manufacturers were awarded points only for their highest finishing car with no points awarded for positions filled by additional cars.
Only the best 3 results out of the 5 races could be retained by each manufacturer. Points earned but not counted towards the championship totals are listed within brackets in the table below.

† - Ferrari declared second due to having the same number of wins, one, and second places, one, as Porsche but having two 3rd-place finishes to Porsche's one.

The cars
The following models contributed to the net championship point scores of their respective manufacturers.

 Aston Martin DBR1/300
 Ferrari 250 TR 59 & Ferrari 250 GT Berlinetta LWB
 Porsche 718 RSK
 Maserati A6GCS/53
 Alfa Romeo Giuletta Sprint Veloce Zagato
 Lola Mk.1 Coventry Climax

References

External links
 1959 World Sportscar Championship race results, www.classicscars.com
 1959 World Sportscar Championship points table, www.classicscars.com

World Sportscar Championship seasons
 
World